The 2021 European Women Basketball Championship, commonly called EuroBasket Women 2021, was the 38th edition of the continental tournament in women's basketball, sanctioned by the FIBA Europe. It was co-hosted by France and Spain between 17 and 27 June 2021. It was the third time to be hosted by multiple countries. The tournament also served as part of European qualification for the 2022 FIBA Women's Basketball World Cup, with the top six nations advancing to the qualifying tournaments. The final were planned to be held at the AccorHotels Arena in Paris but moved to the Pavelló Municipal Font de San Lluís, in Valencia.

Spain was the defending champion. Serbia won their second title winning 63–54 in the final over France, while Belgium won the bronze medal, after defeating Belarus.

Host selection
FIBA Europe announced on 18 April 2019 that four national federations have applied two bids to organize FIBA Women's EuroBasket 2021:
 / 
 / 

France and Spain were selected as co-hosts on 15 July 2019 at the Central Board in Munich, Germany.

Not in the final shortlist:
 /

Qualification

Russia initially received a four-year ban from all major sporting events by the World Anti-Doping Agency on 9 December 2019, after RUSADA was found non-compliant for handing over manipulated laboratory data to investigators. However, the Russian women's team could still enter qualification, as the ban only applies to the Women's Basketball World Cup. Despite that, a team representing Russia, which uses its flag and anthem, is ineligible under the WADA decision. The decision was appealed to the Court of Arbitration for Sport, which ruled in favour of WADA but reduced the ban to two years, lasting until 16 December 2022. The CAS ruling also allowed the name "Russia" to be displayed on uniforms if the words "Neutral Athlete" or "Neutral Team" had equal prominence. If Russia qualifies for the tournament, its women's basketball players will not be able to use their country's name alone, flag or anthem at the Women's World Cup, like their male counterparts, as a result of the nation's two-year ban from world championships and other international sports events organised or sanctioned by a WADA signatory.

Qualified teams

Venues
Originally, the France was going to host the tournament at two venues - the Palais des Sports de Gerland in Lyon and the AccorHotels Arena in Paris which was supposed to host the final segment of the competition as well. However, on 11 May 2020, it was announced that Pavelló Municipal Font de San Lluís in Valencia would host pools A and B in the group stage as well as the finals, while on 18 Sep 2020, it was announced that Rhénus Sport in Strasbourg would host pools C and D.

Marketing
The official logo was unveiled on 28 January 2020. The visual identity focuses on the outlines of some of the most iconic basketball moves where the shapes come together to form the logo and its elements in the shape of the trophy and the year 2021. The logo was designed by the Lisbon-based agency VMLY&R Branding.

Draw
The draw took place on 8 March 2021 in Valencia, Spain.

Seedings
The seeding was confirmed on 3 March 2021.

Squads

All rosters consist of 12 players.

Preliminary round

Group A

Group B

Group C

Group D

Knockout stage

Bracket

Final

Final ranking

Statistics and awards

Statistical leaders

Players

Points

Rebounds

Assists

Blocks

Steals

Efficiency

Teams

Points

Rebounds

Assists

Blocks

Steals

Efficiency

Awards
The All-Tournament team and MVP award was announced on 27 June 2021.

References

External links
Official website
Tournament summary

 
2021
EuroBasket Women
EuroBasket Women 2021
EuroBasket Women 2021
EuroBasket Women
EuroBasket Women
2020–21 in French basketball
2020–21 in Spanish basketball
21st century in Lyon
21st century in Valencia
Sports competitions in Lyon
Sports competitions in Valencia
June 2021 sports events in France
June 2021 sports events in Spain